Eugenia virgultosa is a species of plant in the family Myrtaceae. It is endemic to Jamaica.  It is threatened by habitat loss.

References

virgultosa
Near threatened plants
Endemic flora of Jamaica
Taxonomy articles created by Polbot